WikiWarMonitor is a website dedicated to resolving Wikipedia edit wars. It is operated by a group of researchers from Oxford Internet Institute, Rutgers University, and Central European University.

WikiWarMonitor is part of a project called ICTeCollective (which stands for Harnessing ICT-enabled Collective Social Behaviour) and is supported by the European Commission, CORDIS FP7 (Seventh Framework Programme), information and communications technology (or ICT), and Future and Emerging Technologies Open Scheme (FET-Open).

According to CORDIS, the objective of ICT research under the EU's Seventh Framework Programme (which ICTeCollective and WikiWarMonitor are part of) is "to improve the competitiveness of European industry – as well as to enable Europe to master and shape the future developments of these technologies so that the demands of its society and economy are met."

Findings 
WikiWarMonitor publishes a list of the 100 most controversial Wikipedia articles in 13 different languages using a special algorithm. One of their findings was that the editorial conflicts vary by language and are endless when it comes to polarizing terms such as 'homosexuality', or individuals such as former U.S. President George W. Bush.

Top 100 controversial articles on English Wikipedia
WikiWarMonitor list of top 100 controversial articles in English Wikipedia as of 2013:

George W. Bush
Anarchism
Muhammad
List of World Wrestling Entertainment employees
Global warming
Circumcision
United States
Jesus
Race and intelligence
Christianity
Michael Jackson
Barack Obama
Islam
Intelligent design
Adolf Hitler
Falun Gong
European Union
Abortion
Kosovo
Islamophobia
September 11 attacks
John Kerry
Transnistria
Chiropractic
Macedonians (ethnic group)
Homeopathy
Srebrenica massacre
Scientology
Capitalism
Japan
Israel and apartheid
Israel
Prem Rawat
White people
Catholic Church
Ann Coulter
Jehovah's Witnesses
Hamas
Jimmy Wales
Elvis Presley
Fidel Castro
Joseph Stalin
Jyllands-Posten Muhammad cartoons controversy
John Howard
Black people
India
List of Barney & Friends episodes and videos
2006 Lebanon War
Evolution
Assyrian people
Republic of Macedonia
Wikipedia
United Kingdom
Socialism
Ayn Rand
Developed country
Holodomor
Freemasonry
Fox News Channel
Libertarianism
World War II
Fascism
Afghanistan
Deaths in 2008
Moldova
Ron Paul
Canada
Mahmoud Ahmadinejad
Liberation Tigers of Tamil Eelam
Iran
Wii
Armenian genocide
British Isles
Britney Spears
Banu Qurayza
Mexico
United States and state terrorism
Lyndon LaRouche
John Cena
Nicolaus Copernicus
Second Amendment to the United States Constitution
Turkey
Akatsuki (Naruto)
9/11 conspiracy theories
Super Smash Bros. Brawl
Atheism
Ward Churchill
Islam and antisemitism
Scotland
Quebec
God
Homosexuality
International recognition of Kosovo
Creation Science
People for the Ethical Treatment of Animals
Ronald Reagan
Northern Ireland
The Used
Northern Cyprus
Truth

Publications

References

External links
WikiWarMonitor
ICTeCollective

Wikipedia